Tim Brannigan (born 10 May 1966) is an Irish author, journalist, broadcaster, and political activist, as well as a former member of the Provisional Irish Republican Army.

Upbringing
Brannigan was born in 1966 in Belfast, the son of a Northern Irish mother and a Ghanaian father. As a mixed-race child born out of an affair, social and racial attitudes at the time would not have allowed Brannigan's mother to bring him home. Instead, Brannigan's mother concocted a ruse, in which the Doctor at the clinic in which he was born informed the Brannigan family that Tim had been a stillbirth. The second part of the ruse involved Brannigan being kept at an orphanage for a year before his birth mother "adopted" him on the pretence that he would be a replacement for the stillborn child. This pretence avoided any awkward questions about his conception and, growing up, Brannigan has stated the rest of his family genuinely believed in the ruse his mother had created.

Involvement in the IRA
In July 1990 Brannigan graduated from Liverpool Polytechnic with a degree in politics. In October of that same year, Brannigan was arrested in Belfast for possession of guns and explosives that he acquired for use by the Provisional Irish Republican Army, of which he was a member. Brannigan served his sentence in the notorious H-Block prison, amongst hundreds of other Irish Republican prisoners.

Later life
In 2016 it was revealed that a movie would be made based on his book Where Are You Really From?.

References

1966 births
Black Irish people
Irish republicans
Irish broadcasters
Irish journalists
Irish political activists
Irish writers
Living people
Provisional Irish Republican Army members
Socialists from Northern Ireland